Pig is an unincorporated community in southern Edmonson County, Kentucky, United States. Pig is generally referred to as the area near KY 422, stretching from the road's southern terminus at US 31-W, north along KY 259 towards Rhoda and KY 70 towards Brownsville.

The town was named after disputes over which name to choose. A resident stated he saw a small hog on the road. The name of "Pig" was then accepted.

It is part of the Bowling Green, Kentucky Metropolitan Statistical Area.

The Pig community is approximately 21.2 miles (34.1 km) away from Bowling Green, which is in Warren County.

References

Unincorporated communities in Kentucky
Unincorporated communities in Edmonson County, Kentucky
Bowling Green metropolitan area, Kentucky